The Maine School Administrative District 51 (RSU51/MSAD51) operates three public schools  for students in Cumberland, Maine, and North Yarmouth, Maine. The district has 163 teachers (FTEs) serving 2,320 students.

Note: North Yarmouth Memorial School closed in 2014.

Chebeauge is no longer attached to MSAD 51. Drowne Road School was closed by the residents of Cumberland and North Yarmouth in 2011 due to budget cuts.  North Yarmouth Memorial School was closed in 2014, and Greely Middle School was expanded to fit the students formerly in the North Yarmouth Memorial School. Greely Middle School was opened in 2005 to replace the Greely Junior High School.

References

External links
 

51
Education in Cumberland County, Maine
Cumberland, Maine
North Yarmouth, Maine